Kiska-Yelga (Qıśqayılğa) is a rural locality (a selo) in Urtakulsky Selsoviet, Buzdyaksky District, Bashkortostan, Russia. The population was 509 as of 2010. There are 8 streets.

Geography 
Kiska-Yelga is located 8 km southwest of Buzdyak (the district's administrative centre) by road. Buzdyak is the nearest rural locality.

References 

Rural localities in Buzdyaksky District